Sir Alfred Lewis Jones  (24 February 1845 – 13 December 1909) was a Welsh ship-owner.

Early life
Jones was born on 24 February 1845 in Carmarthen, Wales, to Daniel Jones, owner of The Welshman newspaper, and Mary Jean Jones (née Williams), daughter of the Rev. Henry Williams, rector of Llanedi.

Career

Early career
At the age of twelve he was apprenticed to the managers of the African Steamship Company at Liverpool, making several voyages to the west coast of Africa. By the time he was twenty-six he had risen to be manager of the business. Not finding sufficient scope in this post, he borrowed money to purchase two or three small sailing vessels, and started in the shipping business on his own account. The venture succeeded, and he made additions to his fleet, but after a few years' successful trading, realizing that sailing ships were about to be superseded by steamers, he sold his vessels.

About this time (1891) Messrs. Elder, Dempster & Co., who purchased the business of the old African Steamship Company, offered him a managerial post. This offer he accepted, subject to Messrs. Elder, Dempster selling him a number of their shares, and he thus acquired an interest in the business, and subsequently, by further share purchases, its control. He took a keen interest in imperial affairs. He acquired considerable territorial interests in West Africa, and financial interests in many of the companies engaged in opening up and developing that part of the world.

Elder Dempster employed both E.D. Morel and Roger Casement who in time became bitter enemies of Jones.

Monopolies

In the early 1900s Alfred Jones had a monopoly on the Congo-Antwerp mail traffic as well as consular duties representing King Leopold's Congo State in Liverpool. Described by W.T. Stead as the "Uncrowned King of West Africa", Jones had myriad interests. In 1900, in order to supply his ships with bunker fuel, he formed Elder's Navigation Collieries Ltd. and bought the Oakwood and Garth Merthyr colleries near Maesteg in the Llynfi valley, south Wales. He took the leading part in opening up a new line of communication with the West Indies, and in stimulating the Jamaica fruit trade and tourist traffic. He also developed the tourist trade in the Canary Islands and the banana industry there. Jones was instrumental in founding the Liverpool School of Tropical Medicine and was chairman of the Bank of British West Africa. He was President of the Liverpool Chamber of Commerce.

He had been interested in cotton growing in West Africa and had even distributed cotton seed there. As a result, in 1902, he was approached, and became, inaugural President of the British Cotton Growing Association.

Accolades
Jones was appointed a Knight Commander of the Order of St Michael and St George (KCMG) in the 1901 Birthday Honours list on 9 November 1901, in recognition of services to the West African Colonies, and to Jamaica, and invested as such by King Edward VII at St James's Palace on 17 December 1901.
In May 1902 he was elected an Honorary Fellow of Jesus College, Oxford.

Death and legacy
Sir Alfred died unmarried on 13 December 1909, leaving large charitable bequests.

A main street in Las Palmas de Gran Canaria (Canary Islands) is named after him.

References

External links

 

1845 births
1909 deaths
Businesspeople awarded knighthoods
Knights Commander of the Order of St Michael and St George
People from Carmarthenshire
Welsh businesspeople in shipping
Businesspeople from Liverpool
19th-century English businesspeople
19th-century Welsh businesspeople